"Limón y sal" is Julieta Venegas' second single release from her fourth studio album with the same name. Released in Mexico and USA on August 30, 2006.  It did not chart on the billboard hot Latin songs chart.

The song was written by Julieta Venegas and Jorge Villamizar (Ex-vocalist of Bacilos) and produced by Cachorro López. The song is about the acceptance of a loved one, their strengths and weaknesses.

Music video 

The music video seems to be inspired by classic fairy tales and films from the early 20th century in which she appears in a forest filled with half-human creatures. In the video, Julieta meets a werewolf, and both fall for each other. They start living in a little cabin in the woods, but when the full moon comes, the werewolf runs away and suddenly becomes a very attractive man.

Mesmerized by these new looks, he goes home with the intention of having a romantic picnic with Julieta, but when she looks at him she's distraught and starts to scream in horror, fainting right away. In her sleep, she dreams of a unicorn and an old man. Two pig-headed gentlemen then escort her through a forest, while the old man turns out to be a wizard who invokes apples in order to scare the pigs away. She court-dances with all of them for a while until the real-world's forest satyr plays its horn, waking her up to find her beloved werewolf back to his usual self.

Tracking list
CD Single
"Limón y sal" — 3:08

CD Promo
"Limón y Sal" (Julieta Venegas) — 3:08
"No Me Diga Que No [Boy Like You] (Nikki Clan) — 2:56
"La Excepción" (Gustavo Cerati) — 4:11

Charts

Weekly charts

References

2006 songs
Julieta Venegas songs
Song recordings produced by Cachorro López
Songs written by Jorge Villamizar
Songs written by Julieta Venegas